The Parody Album is the debut album by DJ Chris Moyles, host of The Chris Moyles Show on BBC Radio 1. It was released on 23 November 2009 and charted at number 17 in the UK Albums Chart and has since sold over 100,000 copies.

The album has spawned an online game in which you have to collect lyric notes to complete Moyles' album. The game itself is a parody of Super Mario Bros.

Recording
The album was recorded at the Abbey Road Studios in London throughout September and October 2009, and features parodies made famous on Moyles' Radio 1 show, alongside original compositions and brand new parodies.

The album features many members of The Chris Moyles Show team including Comedy Dave, Carrie Prideaux and Dominic Byrne. Moyles has said that he was proud that the album was an 'Aled-free zone' referring to the absence of The Chris Moyles Show producer, Aled Haydn Jones.

The album features collaborations with Amy Perez, Alex Dover, Ricky Wilson and Calvin Harris.

Track listing

Charts

Weekly charts

Year-end charts

References

2009 albums
Chris Moyles albums